James Arturo Hinesly (December 11, 1933 - August 31, 2016) was a Canadian football player who played for the Hamilton Tiger-Cats. He won the Grey Cup with them in 1957. He played college football at Michigan State University.

References

1931 births
2016 deaths
Hamilton Tiger-Cats players
Living people